The badminton competition at the 1978 Commonwealth Games took place in Edmonton, Alberta, Canada from 3 August until 12 August 1978.

Final Results

Results

Men's singles

Women's singles

Men's doubles

Women's doubles

Mixed doubles

Mixed Team

Semi-finals

Bronze Medal Play off

Final

References

1978
Badminton tournaments in Canada
1978 Commonwealth Games events
1978 in badminton